Sar-i Sang (or Sar-e Sang) (lit. "stone summit" in Persian) is a settlement in the Kuran Wa Munjan District of Badakhshan Province, Afghanistan, famous for its ancient lapis lazuli mines producing the world's finest lapis.  It is located in the Koksha Valley.

Lapis lazuli mines 
The Sar-i Sang lapis lazuli mine probably dates from proto-historic times. It consists of one old disused shaft and two new shafts. This was the main source of lapis lazuli in the ancient world, with lapis from here occurring in such famous archaeological discoveries as the Royal Treasure of Ur and the Tomb of Tutankhamun.

See also
 Mount Imeon

References

 Warwick Ball, 2008, 'The Monuments of Afghanistan: History, Archaeology and Architecture': 261, I.B. TAURIS, London, .
 Warwick Ball, 1982, 'Archaeological Gazetteer of Afghanistan': Volume I: 1001. SAR-I SANG, Editions Recherche sur les civilisations, Paris, 
Lapis lazuli mines at Sar-e Sang, Afghanistan at Mindat.org
 Sarah Stone, 'LAPIS LAZULI in pursuit of a celestial stone', EAST and WEST PUBLISHING LTD, London, 2010,

External links

Satellite map at Maplandia.com 
Lapis Lazuli from Afghanistan by Peter Bancroft, Sar-e-Sang Mine, Jurm, Afghanistan

Populated places in Badakhshan Province
Geological type localities